Sámuel Homoródszentmártoni Biró (1665 – 21 February 1721) was an advisor of the Governor of Transylvania.

He was the first main caretaker of the Unitarian Church of Transylvania (1718–1721).

Sources
Helezd Mihály: Homoródszentmártoni Biró Sámuel Barassó, 1721
Michael Helczdorffer: Genealogia (latin) 1721
Sándor János: Székelykeresztúri Unitárius Gimnázium történelme 1896
Fekete János: A székelykeresztúri Orbán Balázs – volt unitárius – gimnázium 200 éves története. 
Beke György : Régi erdélyi skólák Tankönyvkiadó, Budapest, 1989  300. 
Koncz J. Unitárius főurak a kuruc világban Keresztény Magvető 1902, Unitárius Kislexikon 31.old)
 
 
 Kovács Sándor  Homoródszentmártoni Biró Sámuel (1665–1721)  www.oroksegunk.ro/i-evf-2007/1-szam/eletutak/homorodszent... (hozzáférés: 2017.01.02)
 Kovács Sándor: Adalék homoródszentmártoni Bíró Sámuel (1665–1721) főgondnok életéhez. In: Keresztény Magvető, 108 (2002). nr. 1, p.12–19.
 Wass cs lt (Erdélyi Nemzeti Múzeum Levéltára a A Nemzeti Levéltár Kolozs megyei fiókjának őrízetében Kolozsváron), 30. doboz (3035–3138. sz.)  iratai között: A Wass család pere Gerebenesért (Torda vm) homoródszentmártoni Bíró János és felesége: Orbán Erzsébet örököseivel (1632–1669)
 Pálmay József: Udvarhely vármegye nemes családjai. Székely-Udvarhely: 1900. 37–39.
 Simon Mihály - Unitárius főemberek a kuruc világban  206.old. KM_1902_04

1665 births
1721 deaths
Transylvania